The Cobblestone House in Eau Claire, Wisconsin is a Gothic Revival style house that was built in 1866.  It reflects cobblestone architecture brought by settlers from upstate New York.  It has also been known as Bradley H. Marcy House.  It was listed on the National Register of Historic Places in 1974; the listing included one contributing building and one other contributing structure.

It is the only cobblestone house known to exist in northwestern Wisconsin.  It is also unusual for its Gothic Revival style, instead of Greek Revival style that is far more common for cobblestone buildings.

References

Houses on the National Register of Historic Places in Wisconsin
Gothic Revival architecture in Wisconsin
Houses completed in 1866
Houses in Eau Claire, Wisconsin
Cobblestone architecture
1866 establishments in Wisconsin
National Register of Historic Places in Eau Claire County, Wisconsin